Ochrochroma is a genus of moths in the family Lasiocampidae. The genus was erected by Yves de Lajonquière in 1970.

Species
Ochrochroma cadoreli de Lajonquière, 1969
Ochrochroma nepos de Lajonquière, 1969
Ochrochroma opulenta de Lajonquière, 1969
Ochrochroma seyrigi de Lajonquière, 1969
Ochrochroma simplex Aurivillius, 1908

References

Lasiocampidae